
Gmina Stopnica is a rural gmina (administrative district) in Busko County, Świętokrzyskie Voivodeship, in south-central Poland.

The gmina contains part of the protected area called Szaniec Landscape Park.

Villages
Gmina Stopnica contains the villages and settlements of Białoborze, Borek, Bosowice, Czyżów, Dziesławice, Falęcin Nowy, Falęcin Stary, Folwarki, Jastrzębiec, Kąty Nowe, Kąty Stare, Klępie Dolne, Klępie Górne, Konary, Kuchary, Mariampol, Mietel, Nowa Wieś, Podlasek, Prusy, Skrobaczów, Smogorzów, Stopnica, Strzałków, Suchowola, Szczeglin, Szczytniki, Szklanów, Topola, Wolica, Zaborze and Żerniki Dolne.

Neighbouring gminas
Gmina Stopnica is bordered by the gminas of Busko-Zdrój, Gnojno, Oleśnica, Pacanów, Solec-Zdrój and Tuczępy.

References
 Polish official population figures 2006

Stopnica
Busko County